Firdaposten is a local newspaper published in Kinn Municipality in Vestland county, Norway. It also covers the municipality of Bremanger. The newspaper was established as a media outlet of the Norwegian Labour Party in 1948. The first editor of the paper was Guttorm Hansen. At the initial phase the paper was published twice a week. It is owned by A-Pressen, and had a circulation of 5481 in 2007.

References

External links
Official site

Amedia
Kinn
Newspapers published in Norway
Mass media in Sogn og Fjordane
1948 establishments in Norway
Publications established in 1948
Labour Party (Norway) newspapers